Ellison Bay is an unincorporated community and census-designated place in northern Door County, Wisconsin, United States, within the town of Liberty Grove and is located on Highway 42 along the Green Bay. As of the 2020 census, its population is 249. Sur La Baie, one of Wisconsin's largest and most expensive homes, is located nearby.

History
A Native American name for the bay was Joe-Sahbe Bay, after a son of the Potowatomi Chief Neatoshing, who was also known as Mishicott. Joe-Sahbe means "Feather of the rolling cloud".

The community was founded in 1872 by John Eliasen, a Danish immigrant. Lumber and fishing were important businesses in the 19th century, replaced by fruit growing in the early 20th century, and today tourism is the main business.

Education
Gibraltar Area Schools serves the community. Gibraltar Elementary School and Gibraltar Secondary School are the two schools.

Demographics

Attractions
Important attractions include The Clearing, a private center for adult education that was originally established by Jens Jensen, a prominent landscape architect. It is listed on the National Register of Historic Places. Other attractions include the Mink River four miles south, Turtle Ridge Gallery, a cooking school, former Church turned Asian art gallery turned coffee shop, and pottery studios. Local restaurants in Ellison Bay are the Viking Grill, home to one of Door County's oldest fish boils, and the Wickman House, a restaurant featuring local produce.

Ellison Bluff 
Ellison Bluff County Park includes a scenic hiking trail, a picnic area, and a fenced catwalk. The bluff area has wildflowers and trees. One cedar was found to be over 250 years old. Rough-winged swallows hunt for insects along the bluff. Other birds seen at the park include American redstart, great-crested flycatcher, broad-winged hawk, wood thrush, scarlet tanager, yellow-throated vireo, and pileated woodpecker. 170 acres of the park is protected as the Ellison Bluff State Natural Area.

2006 explosion
On July 10, 2006, an explosion leveled the 136-year-old Pioneer Store, killed two vacationers and injuring 13 others. The blast also burned down one cottage and damaged another. It is believed a propane gas leak caused the explosion, which may have resulted from a contractor damaging unmarked underground propane lines.

Climate

Gallery

References

Sources
Around the Shores of Lake Michigan: A Guide to Historic Sites by Margaret Beattie Bogue (1985, University of Wisconsin Press)

External links
Video tour of Ellison Bluff County Park

Census-designated places in Wisconsin
Census-designated places in Door County, Wisconsin